Almenêches Abbey was a Benedictine nunnery at Almenêches in Orne, Normandy, France. It was founded in the 6th century, but had been abandoned by the 10th century. Roger of Montgomery refounded it sometime between 1063 and 1066.

History
During the Anglo-Norman civil war (1202–04), upon hearing the abbey was being used by Duke Robert Curthose as a stable, Robert of Bellême burned it down. The abbess, Bellême's sister Emma, fled with her sister nuns; they were temporarily accommodated in surrounding houses or at the Abbey of Saint-Evroul. The following year Emma had the abbey at Almenêches rebuilt. It subsequently suffered another fire under Abbess Matilda, Emma's successor, and a third one after 1308.

Episcopal visit
In 1260, Archbishop Eudes Rigaud noted the refectory was not in use; the nuns ate in groups of twos and threes in private rooms. He ordered them to cease this activity and eat in the refectory. Eudes also noted that the nuns ran up debts in the town and that some of the nuns even had children. The nuns also failed to live a communal life, did not attend Matins or Compline, and allowed seculars to visit the nunnery. Eudes admits to finding the nunnery in disarray, explaining he did not have the time to fix every problem he encountered. Instead, Eudes ordered their bishop to instruct their abbess on the proper life for the nuns.

Closure
In 1736, the community was transferred to Argentan Abbey.

References

Sources

53-54

Benedictine nunneries in France
Buildings and structures in Orne